Mariella is an ammonoid genus, named by Nowak (1916) from the upper Albian and Cenomanian stages of the mid Cretaceous, included in the Turrilitidae. Its type is Turrilites bergeri

Description 
Mariella resembles Turrilites in general form.  The shell is asymmetric, closely wound in a long expanding trochoidal spire. Ribs are slightly oblique and are rather feeble, each with 4 more or less equally spaced tubercles. Turrilites differs primarily in being more strongly ribbed and in having a more oval aperture.

Distribution 
Fossils of Mariella have been found in Angola, Antarctica, Australia, Brazil, Canada (British Columbia), Colombia (Hiló Formation), France, Germany, Iran, Japan, Kazakhstan, Madagascar, Mexico, Mozambique, New Zealand, South Africa, Spain, Switzerland, Turkmenistan, Ukraine, the United Kingdom, and the United States (California, Texas, Oregon).

References

Further reading 
 

Ammonitida
Albian genus first appearances
Cenomanian genus extinctions
Ammonites of South America
Cretaceous Brazil
Cretaceous Colombia
Ammonites of Australia
Cretaceous animals of Australia
Ammonites of Antarctica
Late Cretaceous ammonites of North America
Cretaceous Canada
Cretaceous Mexico
Cretaceous United States
Cretaceous Africa
Cretaceous Asia
Late Cretaceous ammonites of Europe